Question 1 was a 2020 ballot measure in Rhode Island to change the official name of the state from State of Rhode Island and Providence Plantations to State of Rhode Island. The proposal passed with 53% of the vote.

Background

The state was officially named the "State of Rhode Island and Providence Plantations" when it declared statehood in 1790. Over time it became commonly known as simply "Rhode Island". In June 2020, Governor Gina Raimondo signed an executive order to remove the phrase "Providence Plantations" from all official state documents. Raimondo wrote "the pain that this association causes to some of our residents should be of concern to all Rhode Islanders and we should do everything in our power to ensure that all communities can take pride in our state", referring to the ties of the word "plantations" to American slavery. However, changing the state's full official name required a state constitutional amendment that needed to be approved by voters.

Results

References

question 1
Rhode Island Question 1
Rhode Island ballot measures
Rhode Island
Name changes due to the George Floyd protests